Mordellistena psammophila is a species of beetle in the genus Mordellistena of the family Mordellidae. It was described by Peyerimhoff.

References

psammophila